Dormani Poudel is a Nepali politician and former chief minister of Bagmati Province. He was in office from 12 February 2018 to 18 August 2021. Poudel was elected parliamentary party leader of the CPN (UML), the largest party in the provincial assembly, on 9 February 2018, receiving 34 votes among 58 provincial assembly members. He was subsequently appointed the first chief minister of Bagmati Province on 12 February 2018, after taking the oath of office from province governor Anuradha Koirala. He previously served as the mayor of Hetauda from 1992 to 2005.(by Aashish Bhandari)

Early life
Poudel was born in Pharping, Kathmandu to Mayanath Poudel and Kul Kumari Poudel. Later, his family moved to Hetauda, Makwanpur.

References

Living people
1946 births
Communist Party of Nepal (Unified Marxist–Leninist) politicians
People from Kathmandu District
Chief Ministers of Nepalese provinces
Members of the Provincial Assembly of Bagmati Province